"A Question of Blood" is a 2006 episode of STV's
Rebus television series. It was the second episode broadcast in the show's third season, and starred Ken Stott in the title role. 
The episode was based on the Ian Rankin novel of the same name.

Plot
After a shooting at a local boarding school Rebus discovers one of the victims was a relative. He blames a local villain, Jez Peacock, for the incident, as the main suspect worked for him. As he digs deeper, Rebus finds the truth is otherwise.

Cast
Ken Stott as DI John Rebus
Claire Price as DS Siobhan Clarke 
Andrew Barr as Jez Peacock
Karen Gillan as Teri Cotter

Footnotes

External links 

2006 British television episodes
Rebus (TV series) episodes